Hickeytown is an unincorporated community in Johnson County, Arkansas, United States.

Famous residents include Red Hickey, whose paternal grandfather founded the town.

References

External links
Hickeytown

Unincorporated communities in Arkansas
Unincorporated communities in Johnson County, Arkansas